Hysterotomy abortion is a surgical procedure that removes an intact fetus from the uterus in a process similar to a cesarean section. The procedure is generally used after another method of termination has failed, or when such a procedure would be medically inadvisable, such as in the case of placenta accreta.

In 2016, this method made up less than 0.01% of all abortions in the United States, with the CDC reporting only 51 having occurred due to the invasive and complex nature of the procedure, and the availability of much simpler and safer methods. In 2022, scholars reported that in the aftermath of the overturning of Roe v. Wade and the subsequent limitations on elective induced abortion in Texas, providers were performing hysterotomy abortions again, under the view that it may not be technically considered an abortion under existing law.

Indications 
As with other abortion procedures, the purpose of a hysterotomy abortion is to end a pregnancy by removing the fetus and placenta. This method is the most dangerous of any abortion procedure, and has the highest complication rate. The procedure is specifically indicated in the management of certain medical conditions including Cesarean Scar Pregnancy.

Procedure 
Hysterotomy is major abdominal surgery; it is generally only performed in hospitals and other advanced practice settings. The procedure is nearly identical to a cesarean section, with two main exceptions: the administration of a feticidal injection of digoxin or potassium chloride before the procedure to ensure fetal demise, guaranteeing compliance with various laws on the subject, and preventing an unintended live birth; and the size of the incision, which is generally smaller than that of a cesarean section, as the fetus is generally not full term.

History 
Scholarly sources place the use of this method since at least 1913. Health officials in the United States warned practitioners against performing hysterotomy abortion in an outpatient setting after it led to the deaths of two women in New York during 1971. The rate of mortality of abortion by hysterotomy and hysterectomy reported in the United States between 1972 and 1981 was 60 per 100,000, or 0.06%.

References

Methods of abortion
Caesarean sections